René de Cárdenas is a Cuban dancer and choreographer born in Havana. A former member of the Cuban National Ballet, he is also the creator of Sonlar, a musical performed worldwide, describing a day in the life of a Havana barrio, a  kind of communal house where several families live together.

References

External links
About Sonlar

Living people
Cuban male dancers
Year of birth missing (living people)